Mahamaya may refer to:

Mahāmāyā Tantra — a Buddhist tantra
Mahamaya, Chhattisgarh — a small town in Durg district, Chhattisgarh
Mahamaya Chhara Irrigation Extension Project - an irrigation project in Bangladesh
Mahamaya Dham - a Hindu temple in Assam
Mahamaya (film) — a 1944 Indian Tamil language film
Mahamaya Girls' College, Kandy - college
Mahamaya Kalika Devasthan Kasarpal - a  temple complex in Kasarpal
Mahamaya Rajkiya Allopathic Medical College - medical college in Akbarpur, Ambedkar Nagar
Mahamaya Temple - a Hindu temple in Ratanpur